Recques-sur-Hem is a commune in the Pas-de-Calais department in the Hauts-de-France region of France.

Geography
Recques-sur-Hem lies 10 miles (16 km) northwest of Saint-Omer, on the D217 road, by the banks of the river Hem.

Population

Places of interest
 The thirteenth-century church of St. Wandrille.
 The eighteenth-century Château de Cocove
 Traces of ancient châteaux.

See also
Communes of the Pas-de-Calais department

References

Recquessurhem